Joseph Bouasse Ombiogno Perfection (1 September 1998 – 25 May 2020) was a Cameroonian footballer.

Career
He made his professional debut in the Serie B for Vicenza on 25 February 2017, in a game against Avellino.

Death
Bouasse died in Rome, Italy on 25 May 2020, from a heart attack, aged 21.

References

External links
 
 

1998 births
Footballers from Yaoundé
2020 deaths
Cameroonian footballers
Cameroonian expatriate footballers
Expatriate footballers in Italy
Expatriate footballers in Romania
L.R. Vicenza players
Serie B players
Association football midfielders
FC Universitatea Cluj players
A.S. Roma players
Cameroonian expatriate sportspeople in Italy
Cameroonian expatriate sportspeople in Romania